Local elections were held on 13 December 2020 in the 266 municipalities of Niger.

References 

Local elections
Nigerien local elections
Nigerien local elections
Local elections in Niger